Billboard Top Country & Western Records of 1954 is made up of two year-end charts compiled by Billboard magazine ranking the year's top country and western records based on record sales and juke box plays.

Hank Snow's "I Don't Hurt Anymore" was the year's No. 1 record on both the record sales and juke box charts. 

"One by One", a duet by Kitty Wells and Red Foley, ranked No. 2 on both charts.

Webb Pierce had four of the year's top 10 best-selling records with "Slowly" (No. 3), "Even Tho" (No. 4), "More and More" (No. 6), and "There Stands the Glass" (No. 8).

Other artists with multiple records on the year-end lists included Slim Whitman and Eddy Arnold with three each.

See also
List of Billboard number-one country songs of 1954
Billboard year-end top 30 singles of 1954
1954 in country music

Notes

References

1954 record charts
Billboard charts
1954 in American music